Paavaadakkaari is a 1978 Indian Malayalam-language film, directed by Rochy Alex. The film stars Vincent, Unnimary, Manjula Vijayakumar,  and Sreelatha Namboothiri. The film has musical score by A. T. Ummer.

Cast

Vincent 
Unnimary
Cochin Haneefa  
Manjula Vijayakumar 
Vijayalalitha
Poojappura Ravi 
Sreelatha Namboothiri 
Prathapachandran 
Paul Vengola 
Sadhana

Soundtrack
The song was by A. T. Ummer with lyrics by Yusufali Kechery.

References

External links
 

1978 films
1970s Malayalam-language films